Ethan Gross is an American television writer.

Career
He worked for three seasons on the FOX science-fiction series Fringe, as executive story editor and writer.

He co-wrote the independent thriller Klepto with the film's director, Thomas Trail.

Gross co-wrote the screenplay for Ad Astra with James Gray, the director of The Lost City of Z.

Fringe episodes
 "The Man from the Other Side" (2.19) (co-written with co-executive producer Josh Singer)
 "Amber 31422" (3.05) (co-written by Singer)
 "Immortality" (3.13) (co-written by co-executive producer David Wilcox)
 "Forced Perspective" (4.10)

References

External links 
 

American television writers
American male television writers
Living people
Year of birth missing (living people)
Place of birth missing (living people)